Charles Frederick Askew was the Dean of Nelson from 1923  until 1933.

Askew was educated at Jesus College, Cambridge and  ordained in 1990. His first post was a curacy at Laisterdyke. He was Vicar of St John Ingrow from 1906 to 1911, and then Saint Mark Wellington.

He died on 6 December 1934

References

1934 deaths
Deans of Nelson
Alumni of Jesus College, Cambridge
Year of birth missing